Sultan Ibrahim Ali Omar Shah Ibni Sultan Muhammad Hassan Ibni Sultan Saiful Rijal Ibni Sultan Abdul Kahar Ibni Sultan Bolkiah Ibni Sultan Sulaiman Ibni Sultan Sharif Ali Barakat, also known as Sultan Tengah Manga (died in 1641). He was born with the title of Pengiran Raja Tengah (Middle Prince) and was the first and only ruler of the Sultanate of Sarawak.

Background
His father, Sultan Muhammad Hassan, was Brunei's ninth Sultan from 1582 to 1598. At his death, he was succeeded by his brother, Sultan Abdul Jalilul Akbar.

Succession
Sultan Abdul Jalilul Akbar, Pengiran Muda Tengah, also wanted to become Sultan of Brunei by claiming himself the rightful successor on the basis of having been born when his father became the Crown Prince. Sultan Abdul Jalilul Akbar responded by proclaiming Pengiran Muda Tengah as Sultan of Sarawak, as at that time Sarawak was a territory administered by Brunei.

After the proclamation was made, Pengiran Muda Tengah went to Sarawak to prepare for his coronation. He brought with him a few nobles who were his loyal supporters accompanied by over 1,000 warriors.

Reign
Upon arriving in Sarawak, Sultan Tengah build a palace in the area which is known as the present day Kuching. He began to consolidate his power, appointing several of his loyal supporters to a high rank in his administration. He also introduced the post of Datu Patinggi, Datu Shahbandar, Datu Amar and Datu Temenggong. Sultan Tengah proclaimed himself Sultan Ibrahim Ali Omar Shah, and was also known as Sultan Abdul Jalil.

Marriages and Family
Sultan Tengah married Puteri Suria Kesuma, the younger sister of the Sultan of Sukadana, Sultan Muhammad Saifuddin. She gave birth to the princes Radin Sulaiman, Pengiran Badaruddin (later known as Pengiran Bendahara Seri Maharaja) and Pengiran Abdul Wahab (later known as Pengiran Temenggong Jaya Kesuma).

In Matan, Sultan Tengah married the Matan Princess who had the son Pengiran Mangku Negara, who became Sultan of Matan.

Death
Sultan Tengah was killed at Batu Buaya in 1641 by one of his followers. He was buried in Kampong Batu Buaya. With his death, the Sultanate of Sarawak came to an end and later consolidated into Brunei once more.
Sultan Muda Tunku Pangeran Muhammad Azlan Sah Bin Sultan Tunku Yusof Madi Bin Sultan Tunku Bahtiar, 

Sultan Ibrahim Ali Omar Shah Bin Sultan Muhammd Hassan, 

Sultan Muhammad Shafiuddin Bin Sultan Ibrahim Omar Shah,

Sultan Muhammad Tajuddin Bin Sultan Muhammad Shafiuddin,

Sultan Haji bujang Bin Sultan Muhammad Tajuddin, 

Sultan Fauzi Bin Sultan Haji Bujang, 

Sultan Abdul Rani Bin Sultan Fauzi,

Sultana Mariana Binti Sultan Abdul Rani 
(Kingdom Of Brunei) Wife Sultan Tunku Yusof Madi Bin Sultan Tunku Bahtiar (Kingdom Of Pagaruyung),

Sultan Muda Tunku Pangeran Muhammad Azlan Sah Bin Sultan Tunku Yusof Madi (King IX Of Sarawak Darussalam),

Sultana Muda Tunku Puteri Mahyunisa Binti Sultan Tunku Yusof Madi (Queen IX Of Sabah Darussalam).

References

History of Sarawak
Sarawak royalty
16th-century monarchs in Asia
17th-century monarchs in Asia